Patrick Ledwell is a Canadian stand-up comedian, best known as a frequent guest on the CBC Radio comedy series The Debaters. The brother of musician and artist Daniel Ledwell, he is from Charlottetown, Prince Edward Island.

In 2012 Ledwell published the humour book I Am an Islander, which was illustrated by Daniel. Some copies of the book were sold with a bonus DVD of Think Like a Fish, an animated film on which Patrick and Daniel also collaborated. In 2016, he published the sequel book An Islander Strikes Back.

In 2017 he played John A. Macdonald in Jonathan Torrens's Canada Day comedy special Your Special Canada. Ledwell also regularly performs with musician Mark Haines as part of the Island Summer Review, a music and storytelling show.

In 2020 during the COVID-19 pandemic in Canada, he was one of the guest readers in The East Pointers' livestreamed "#Annedemic" readings of Anne of Green Gables.

References

External links

Living people
21st-century Canadian comedians
21st-century Canadian male writers
Canadian stand-up comedians
Canadian male comedians
Canadian humorists
Comedians from Prince Edward Island
Writers from Charlottetown
Year of birth missing (living people)